Lee Ross (born 1971) is an English actor known for his roles as nice guy Kenny Phillips in the classic CITV dramedy Press Gang and as the violent and sadistic Owen Turner in the BBC soap opera EastEnders. He is also known for his work in the drama series Dodger, Bonzo and the Rest, Secrets & Lies and The Catherine Tate Show.

Career
Prior to his first acting role, Lee Ross attended Stockwood High School, Luton. He first became a familiar face on British television in 1983 as one of the children in a Colgate commercial which featured a parody of the hit Madness song Baggy Trousers.  His first acting role was as Fat Sam in Micky Dolenz' West End production of Bugsy Malone. He then went on to play Dodger in the TV series Dodger, Bonzo and the Rest, which was a spin-off from the series Dramarama. The series ran from 1985 till 1986. He next played Kenny Phillips in Press Gang from 1989 to 1991.

He also had lead roles in two films in 1990, playing Bryan in Amongst Barbarians and Phil in Sweet Nothing. He also had small roles in Buddy's Song in 1990, playing Jason, and in the 1999 film Rogue Trader, playing Danny.

He had another lead role in the movie Hard Men playing the part of a gangster and in 1995 he played Gumbo in the film I.D.

In 1991 he played Justin Parrish, the son of Jim Broadbent's character, in Work!. In 1992 and 1993 he had roles in The Guilty, Between the Lines, Casualty, Westbeach, The Bill and The Upper Hand. He had many more roles in the late 1990s including Trial & Retribution 

He played Paul, the boyfriend of Roxanne (Cynthia Purley's daughter) in the critically acclaimed 1996 Mike Leigh film Secrets & Lies, appearing in just white briefs in his opening scene. He provided the voice for Hawkbit in all three television series of the 1999 Watership Down series.

Most recently in 2012 he performed on stage at the Royal Court in London. He played Barry in David Eldrige's In Basildon.

He has appeared on The Catherine Tate Show in many sketches, working alongside Catherine Tate and Niky Wardley. He has also had many guest roles in a variety of television shows, including Waking the Dead, Hustle, Jericho, M.I.T.: Murder Investigation Team and recurring roles in Mutual Friends and Life on Mars/Ashes to Ashes.

In 2018, Ross starred as retired drag queen Hugo Battersby/ Loco Chanelle in the hit West End musical Everybody's Talking About Jamie.
Lee was awarded an Honorary Doctorate from Bedfordshire University in 2014 for his Outstanding Contribution to the Acting Profession.
Other awards include Best Actor BBC Audio Awards 2014, Best Actor in a leading role Massachusetts Film Festival 2016. Nominated for Laurence Olivier Award for Best Supporting Actor for his role as Jack Firebrace in Birdsong at The Comedy Theatre.

Filmography

Films

TV

Video games

External links
 

English male voice actors
English male television actors
English male stage actors
Male actors from London
1971 births
Living people
Liberty Records artists
Male actors from Bedfordshire
Actors from Luton